Iftikhar Hussain (1865 – 1927), known by his pen name Muztar Khairabadi, was an Indian Urdu poet.

Biography
Khairabadi was born in 1865 in Khairabad. He was the grandson of Fazl-e-Haq Khairabadi, who was also a poet, philosopher, religious scholar, Arabist, Persian and Urdu writer and freedom fighter. Khairabadi's first mentor was his mother. He spent his life in Khairabad, Tonk, Gwalior, Indore, Bhopal and Rampur.

He received the titles Eitbar-ul-Mulk, and Iftikhar-ul-Shaura.  He died in 1927 in Gwalior, and is buried there.

He was the father of poet and lyricist Jan Nisar Akhtar and grandfather of Javed Akhtar and Salman Akhtar. His great grandchildren include Farhan Akhtar, Zoya Akhtar, and Kabir Akhtar.

Khairabadi wrote poetry books. He also published a literary magazine entitled Karishama-e-Dilbar.

Khairabadi died on 27 March 1927 in Gwalior.

Bibliography
His works include:
 Nazr-e-Khuda (in Praise of God), a poetry collection
 Meelaad-e-Mustafa, the collection of na`at
 Behr-e-Taweel, a poem 
 Marg-e-Ghalat ki Fariyad, a ghazal

See also

 List of Urdu language poets

References

Further reading
 Khalil Ullah Khan, Muztar Khairabadi: Hayat aur shairi (Urdu Publishers, Nazir Abad, Lucknow, 1979).
 Mohammed Abdul Shahid Khan Sherwani, Baghi Hindustan (Almajma al-Islami, Mubarakpur, 1947).
 Nashtar Khairabadi, ed., Ilhaamaat (1934).

Indian male poets
Urdu-language poets from India
1865 births
1927 deaths
People from British India
19th-century Indian poets
20th-century Indian poets
Poets from Uttar Pradesh
19th-century Indian male writers
20th-century Indian male writers
People from Sitapur district